Katasonov is a rural locality (a khutor) in Mikhaylovka Urban Okrug, Volgograd Oblast, Russia. The population was 456 as of 2010. There are 19 streets.

Geography 
Katasonov is located 19 km east of Mikhaylovka. Prudki is the nearest rural locality.

References 

Rural localities in Mikhaylovka urban okrug